The  is a rapid transit system in Sendai, Japan. It is operated by the Sendai City Transportation Bureau. The subway consists of two lines, the north-south Namboku Line, which opened in July 1987, and the east-west Tozai Line, which opened in December 2015.

The subway was damaged in the 11 March 2011 Tohoku earthquake and tsunami and shut down. It reopened on 29 April 2011.

Lines

Rolling stock
 Sendai Subway 1000 series 4-car EMUs (Namboku Line, since July 1987)
 Sendai Subway 2000 series 4-car EMUs (Tozai Line, since December 2015)

Network Map

References

External links

 Sendai City Transportation Bureau 
 Sendai Subway – official website 
 Network map
 Sendai Subway Map 
 Tōzai Line – official website 

Underground rapid transit in Japan
Transport in Sendai
1987 establishments in Japan